Belidzhi (Belici) is a rural locality (a selo) in Derbentsky District, Republic of Dagestan, Russia. The population was 4,282 as of 2010. The village has an Azerbaijani-majority. There are 43 streets.

Geography 
Belidzhi is located 26 km southeast of Derbent (the district's administrative centre) by road. Novy Frig and Kullar are the nearest rural localities.

References 

Rural localities in Derbentsky District